Nikki Kesangane McCray-Penson (born December 17, 1971) is the former head coach of the Mississippi State Bulldogs women's basketball team and a former professional women's basketball player.  She played in the Women's National Basketball Association (WNBA) for eight seasons. In 2008 after leaving the WNBA, McCray joined the coaching staff as an assistant coach for the University of South Carolina Gamecocks. McCray-Penson was inducted into the Women's Basketball Hall of Fame in 2012.

Playing career
A  guard from the University of Tennessee, McCray was a member of the Washington Mystics, the Indiana Fever, the Phoenix Mercury, the San Antonio Silver Stars, and the Chicago Sky.  She was named to three WNBA All-Star teams (in 1999, 2000, and 2001) and scored 2,550 career points.  Prior to joining the WNBA in 1998, she was a star in the now-defunct American Basketball League. While playing in the American Basketball League, McCray was named Most Valuable Player for the 1996–97 season.

McCray has also played basketball at the international level.  She won gold medals at the 1996 and 2000 Summer Olympics, and she participated on America's 1998 FIBA World Championship team. She made a name for herself in women's basketball as a world class defender by shutting down a number of the world's best players.

In 2000, she was named a member of the President's Fitness Council, and was also chosen for the 2000 USA Olympic basketball team.

Coaching career

Previously McCray was an assistant coach at University of South Carolina. She made a new home for herself at the University of South Carolina with a former teammate as head coach, Dawn Staley. Staley said about McCray: "Nikki is hungry for success, and that comes from playing at Tennessee where the coach never settles for anything less than being number one at whatever she's doing. That mentality is instilled in Nikki, and I want people around me like that. She is energetic, confident and engaging – all qualities that you need when you're coaching and recruiting. We spent two Olympic Games together and have shared being successful in the very best arena there is to test yourself." She resigned as head coach at Mississippi State in October, 2021 citing health reasons.

Other work
In addition to her career on the court, McCray also created a name for herself in the realm of community service. In the year 2000 Nikki McCray was hand-picked by President Bill Clinton to be made a member of the President's Council on Physical Fitness and Sports.

In 1999 The Library of Congress selected Nikki McCray to be the keynote speaker for the Women's History Month Address. "We are pleased to have Ms. McCray with us to kick-off our month long celebration of women's history," said Federal Women's Program Manager Jean Parker. "As an employee of the first women's professional basketball team in the nation's capital and through her community service, Ms. McCray is a wonderful role model for young people."

Tennessee statistics
Source

Head coaching record

References

External links
 WNBA.com profile
 Coaching profile

1971 births
Living people
African-American basketball coaches
African-American basketball players
All-American college women's basketball players
American women's basketball coaches
American women's basketball players
Basketball coaches from Tennessee
Basketball players at the 1996 Summer Olympics
Basketball players at the 2000 Summer Olympics
Basketball players from Tennessee
Chicago Sky players
Columbus Quest players
Indiana Fever players
Medalists at the 1996 Summer Olympics
Medalists at the 2000 Summer Olympics
Mississippi State Bulldogs women's basketball coaches
Old Dominion Monarchs women's basketball coaches
Olympic gold medalists for the United States in basketball
Parade High School All-Americans (girls' basketball)
Phoenix Mercury players
People from Collierville, Tennessee
San Antonio Stars players
Shooting guards
South Carolina Gamecocks women's basketball coaches
Tennessee Lady Volunteers basketball players
Washington Mystics players
Western Kentucky Lady Toppers basketball coaches
Women's National Basketball Association All-Stars
21st-century African-American sportspeople
21st-century African-American women
20th-century African-American sportspeople
20th-century African-American women
United States women's national basketball team players